A backstage pass is a pass which allows its bearer access to employees-only areas at a performance venue. Backstage pass may also refer to:

Backstage Pass (album), a 1980 double live album by Little River Band
Backstage Pass (band), a pop-punk band from Los Angeles
Backstage Pass, a 2016 visual novel video game by sakevisual
Backstage Pass, a DVD compilation of The Simpsons episodes
Backstage Pass, a former Walt Disney World attraction that later became part of the Studio Backlot Tour
"Backstage Pass", a 2001 episode of That '70s Show
BackStage Pass, a music television show produced by WKAR-TV
Backstage Passes and Backstabbing Bastards, the 1998 autobiography of Al Kooper
Dude Perfect: Backstage Pass, a 2020 documentary about Dude Perfect's history and a YouTube Originals video
Grateful Dead: Backstage Pass, a 1992 documentary film about the Grateful Dead
Guitar Hero III: Backstage Pass, a game in the Guitar Hero Mobile series

See also
View from a Backstage Pass, a 2007 double live album by The Who